Rod Adair is an American politician who served as a member of the New Mexico Senate for district 33 from 1997 to 2013.

Early life and education 
Adair was born in Hagerman, New Mexico and graduated from Hagerman High School. He earned a Bachelor of Arts degree in political science from Eastern New Mexico University in 1975 and a Master of Arts in government from Campbell University in 1985.

Career 
Adair served in the United States Army from 1976 to 1996 and was stationed in Korea and 15 South American countries. He ended his career as a professor of military science at the New Mexico Military Institute in Roswell. Adair was elected to the New Mexico Senate in 1996 and assumed office in 1997. Also in 1996, Adair founded New Mexico Demographic Research.

Initially a candidate for re-election in 2012, Adair withdrew from the race after facing a primary challenge from William Burt. Adair has since worked as the editor of the New Mexico Political Journal. Adair has also written op-ed columns about New Mexico politics for the Albuquerque Journal and worked as an election manager and aide in the office of Secretary of State Dianna Duran.

Personal life 
Adair and his wife, Dana, have two children. Dana is an elementary school teacher.

References 

Living people
Eastern New Mexico University alumni
Campbell University alumni
Republican Party New Mexico state senators
People from Roswell, New Mexico
Year of birth missing (living people)